Girlfriend is a 2018 Bengali romantic-family comedy film, directed by Raja Chanda and produced by Nispal Singh under the banner of Surinder Films. The official poster of the film released on 10 August. The official trailer released on 11 October 2018. The film is a remake of 2015 Telugu movie Cinema Choopistha Mava.

Cast
Bonny Sengupta as Uttam Kumar
Koushani Mukherjee as Suchitra, Uttam's love interest
Bharat Kaul as Kamal Mitra, Deputy Secretary, Health Ministry
Kanchan Mallick as Bus conductor
Sukanya as Suchitra's mother
Biswajit Chakraborty as Dr. Utpal Dutta
Shankar Chakraborty as Uttam's father

Soundtrack

Girlfriend(2018) film 3 songs composed by Jeet Gannguli and 1 song composed by Rupam Islam.

References

Indian romantic comedy films
Bengali remakes of Telugu films
2018 films
Films directed by Raja Chanda
Bengali-language Indian films
2010s Bengali-language films
2018 romantic comedy films
Films scored by Jeet Ganguly